Alvin Heggs (born December 8, 1967) is an American former professional basketball player. A 6'9" and 225 lb forward born in Jacksonville, Florida, he attended the University of Texas and Florida Community College.

Heggs participated in four games for the NBA's Houston Rockets in November 1995. He was also selected in the 2nd round of the 1989 CBA Draft by the Omaha Racers.  He played two seasons in the CBA.  In 68 games with the Grand Rapids Hoops, Omaha Racers and Oklahoma City Cavalry, Heggs averaged 9.9 points and 6.4 rebounds per game. Al Heggs is currently in Arizona and is the GM for Heggs CJDR a Car Dealership.

References

External links
NBA stats @ basketballreference.com

1967 births
Living people
African-American basketball players
American men's basketball players
Basketball players from Jacksonville, Florida
Grand Rapids Hoops players
Houston Rockets players
Florida State College at Jacksonville alumni
Junior college men's basketball players in the United States
Oklahoma City Cavalry players
Omaha Racers players
Small forwards
Texas Longhorns men's basketball players
Undrafted National Basketball Association players
21st-century African-American people
20th-century African-American sportspeople